Skierniewice railway station is a railway station serving Skierniewice in Łódź Voivodeship, Poland. It is classed as a regional station on the classification of Polish railway stations and is served by Koleje Mazowieckie, which runs services from Skierniewice to Warszawa Wschodnia, and Łódzka Kolej Aglomeracyjna which runs services to Warsaw, Łowicz and Łódź.

It was built as part of the second stage of the Warsaw–Vienna railway which opened in 1845. The station building was built in 1875, burnt 1914 and was rebuilt by architect Jan Heurich in the English Gothic style with neoclassical interior. Renovated 1980-2003 (plaster removed, brick walls shown),

Train services
The station is served by the following service(s):
 Intercity services (IC) Łódź Fabryczna — Warszawa Główna/Warszawa Wschodnia
 Intercity services (IC) Łódź Fabryczna — Warszawa — Lublin Główny
 Intercity services (IC) Łódź Fabryczna — Warszawa — Gdańsk Glowny — Kołobrzeg Intercity services (IC) Łódź Fabryczna — Bydgoszcz — Gdynia Główna Intercity services (IC) Bydgoszcz Główna — Warszawa GłównaIntercity services (IC) Wrocław- Opole - Częstochowa - WarszawaKoleo. PKP IC 6124 FREDRO Wrocław Główny — Warszawa Wschodnia. Timetable. https://koleo.pl/pociag/IC/6124-FREDRO/
 Intercity services (IC) Wrocław - Ostrów Wielkopolski - Łódź - Warszawa Intercity services (IC) Zgorzelec - Legnica - Wrocław - Ostrów Wielkopolski - Łódź - WarszawaIntercity services (IC) Białystok - Warszawa - Częstochowa - Opole - WrocławIntercity services (IC) Białystok - Warszawa - Łódź - Ostrów Wielkopolski - WrocławIntercity services (IC) Ełk - Białystok - Warszawa - Łódź - Ostrów Wielkopolski - WrocławIntercity services (IC) Warszawa - Częstochowa - Katowice - Bielsko-BiałaIntercity services (IC) Białystok - Warszawa - Częstochowa - Katowice - Bielsko-Biała Intercity services (IC) Kołobrzeg - Piła - Bydgoszcz - Warszawa - Lublin - Hrubieszów 
Intercity services (IC) Olsztyn - Warszawa - Skierniewice - ŁódźIntercity services (IC) Olsztyn - Warszawa - Skierniewice - Częstochowa - Katowice - Bielsko-BiałaIntercity services (IC) Olsztyn - Warszawa - Skierniewice - Częstochowa - Katowice - Gliwice - RacibórzIntercity services (TLK) Warszawa - Częstochowa - Lubliniec - Opole - Wrocław - Szklarska Poręba GórnaIntercity services (TLK) Gdynia Główna — Zakopane Koleo. PKP TLK 53104 MAŁOPOLSKA Gdynia Główna — Zakopane. Timetable. https://koleo.pl/en/pociag/TLK/53104-MA%C5%81OPOLSKA
 InterRegio services (IR) Łódź Fabryczna — Warszawa Glowna 
 InterRegio services (IR) Łódź Kaliska — Warszawa Glowna 
 InterRegio services (IR) Ostrów Wielkopolski — Łódź — Warszawa Główna InterRegio services (IR) Poznań Główny — Ostrów Wielkopolski — Łódź — Warszawa GłównaRegional services (ŁKA) Łódz - SkierniewiceRegional services (ŁKA) Łódz - WarsawRegional services (ŁKA) Skierniewice - Kutno''

References

Station article at kolej.one.pl

External links 
 

Railway stations in Poland opened in 1845
Railway stations in Łódź Voivodeship
Railway stations served by Koleje Mazowieckie
Buildings and structures in Skierniewice
Railway stations served by Przewozy Regionalne InterRegio
Railway stations served by Łódzka Kolej Aglomeracyjna